The 1982 Centennial Cup  is the 12th Junior "A" 1982 ice hockey National Championship for the Canadian Junior A Hockey League.

The Centennial Cup was competed for by the winners of the Abbott Cup/Western Canadian Champions and the Eastern Canadian Jr. A  Champions.

The finals were hosted by the Prince Albert Raiders in the city of Prince Albert, Saskatchewan.

The Playoffs

Additional playdowns
Ontario Hockey Association Championship
Guelph Platers (OJ) defeated Onaping Falls Huskies (NO) 3-games-to-none

MCC Finals

Regional Championships
Manitoba Centennial Cup: Prince Albert Raiders

Abbott Cup: Prince Albert Raiders
Eastern Champions: Guelph Platers

Doyle Cup: St. Albert Saints
Anavet Cup: Prince Albert Raiders
Dudley Hewitt Cup: Guelph Platers
Callaghan Cup: Moncton Hawks

Roll of League Champions
AJHL: St. Albert Saints
BCJHL: Penticton Knights
CJHL: Pembroke Lumber Kings
IJHL: North River North Stars
MJHL: Winnipeg South Blues
MVJHL: Halifax Lions
NBJHL: Moncton Hawks
NMJHL: Flin Flon Bombers
NOJHL: Onaping Falls Huskies
OJHL: Guelph Platers
PCJHL: Prince George Spruce Kings
QJAHL: La Prairie Flames
SJHL: Prince Albert Raiders

Awards
Most Valuable Player: Carl Van Camp (Prince Albert Raiders)
Most Sportsmanlike Player: Carl Van Camp (Prince Albert Raiders)

All-Star Team
Forward
Carl Van Camp(Prince Albert Raiders)
Bill Watson (Prince Albert Raiders)
Barcley Rocheleau (Prince Albert Raiders)
Defence
Dave Reierson (Prince Albert Raiders)
Peter Herms (Guelph Platers)
Goal
Darryl Pierce (Prince Albert Raiders)

See also
Canadian Junior A Hockey League
Royal Bank Cup
Anavet Cup
Doyle Cup
Dudley Hewitt Cup
Fred Page Cup
Abbott Cup
Mowat Cup

External links
Royal Bank Cup Website

1982
Ice hockey competitions in Saskatchewan
Cup
Sport in Prince Albert, Saskatchewan